Buried Worlds with Don Wildman (or Buried Worlds for short) is a documentary reality television series that follows TV host and adventurer Don Wildman on his quest to find the mysteries of long-lost worlds.

The first season of eight episodes premiered on Travel Channel on Monday June 8, 2020 at 9/8c.

Premise
Host/adventurer Don Wildman journeys to the most remote areas and forgotten places to explore the world's darkest mysteries and uncover its secrets to the public. He heads to terrifying territories of the supernatural, paranormal, and even learns about cryptic-logical locations where ghosts, vampires, demons, and witches are known to occupy these lands.

Opening Introduction:

Episodes

References

External links

2020s American documentary television series
2020 American television series debuts
English-language television shows
American adventure television series
Paranormal reality television series
Adventure travel